The principal is the chief executive and the chief academic officer of a university or college in certain parts of the Commonwealth.

In the United States, the principal is the head of school at most pre-university, non-boarding schools.

Canada 
Queen's University, the constituent colleges of the University of Toronto and McGill University in Canada have principals instead of presidents or rectors, as a result of their Scottish origins. In addition Bishop's University, and the Royal Military College of Canada also have principals.

England 
Many colleges of further education in England have a principal in charge (e.g., Cirencester College and West Nottinghamshire College).

At Oxford University, many of the heads of colleges are known as the principal, including Brasenose, Green Templeton, Harris Manchester, Hertford, Jesus, Lady Margaret Hall, Linacre, Mansfield, St Anne's, St Edmund Hall, St Hilda's, St Hugh's, and Somerville.

At Cambridge University, heads of Homerton College and Newnham College are known as the principal. 

At Durham University, the heads of most of the colleges are known as the principal. 

Several of the colleges of the University of London are led by a principal: King's, St George's, Royal Holloway, Queen Mary, the Royal Veterinary College, SOAS, Heythrop, the Royal Academy of Music and the Royal Central School of Speech and Drama.

Scotland

In Scotland the principal is appointed by the University Court or governing body of the University and will be chairman or president of the body of academics.  In the case of the ancient universities of Scotland the principal is president of the Academic Senate.  The principal also holds the title of vice-chancellor, but their powers with regard to this position extend only to the awarding of degrees, as both the vice-chancellor and chancellor are titular posts.

United States

In 1999, there were about 133,000 principals and assistant principals in the United States.  In the early decades of public education, the full title was "principal teacher", which accounts for the present day title having an adjectival form, essentially being a shortened version of the original full title. Yet the terms head(master/mistress) and head of school are still used in older schools, such as in Louisiana and some southern small towns. 
School principals in the United States are sometimes required to have school administrator licensing, and often, a master's degree in educational administration.

See also 
 Head

References 

Academic administration
Principal